Jaluke (जलुके) is a small town in Arghakhanchi District in the Lumbini Zone of southern Nepal. At the time of the 2011 Nepal census it had a population of 6,142 and had 1242 houses in the town. It is located approximately 234 km/145 mi from the Nepal's capital, Kathmandu.
Bhairawaha is the nearest custom clearance border.

References

Populated places in Arghakhanchi District